Beitbridge West is a constituency of the National Assembly of the Parliament of Zimbabwe. Located in Matabeleland South Province, is currently represented by Ruth Mavhungu-Maboyi of ZANU–PF. Previously, it was represented by Metrine Mudau.

Members

References 

Beitbridge
Matabeleland South Province
Parliamentary constituencies in Zimbabwe